The following lists the number-one singles on the New Zealand Singles Chart during the 1980s. The source for this decade is the Recorded Music NZ chart, the chart history of which can be found on the Recorded Music NZ website or Charts.nz.

A total of 150 singles topped the chart in the 1980s, including 20 by New Zealand artists. Three artists had three or more number-one singles; the most successful was U2, who spent 19 weeks at number one with five different singles. UB40 and Stevie Wonder reached number one three times, and two New Zealand acts topped the chart more than once this decade: Jon Stevens and Tex Pistol.

Two songs spent nine weeks at number one during the 1980s. The first was "Hands Up (Give Me Your Heart)" by French pop duo Ottawan in 1981, and the second was "Sailing Away" by New Zealand supergroup All of Us in 1986. Not counting Jon Stevens' "Jezebel", which reached number one in 1979, four singles topped the chart for eight weeks this decade: "Shaddap You Face" by Joe Dolce Music Theatre, "How Great Thou Art" by Howard Morrison, "I Just Called to Say I Love You" by Stevie Wonder, and "Slice of Heaven" by Dave Dobbyn and Herbs.

Key
 – Number-one single of the year
 – Song of New Zealand origin
 – Number-one single of the year, of New Zealand origin

 ← 1979
 1980
 1981
 1982
 1983
 1984
 1985
 1986
 1987
 1988
 1989
 1990s →

1980

1981

1982

1983

Note: The highest-selling single of New Zealand in 1983 was New Order's "Blue Monday", which peaked at number two for two weeks behind Michael Jackson's "Beat It".

1984

1985

1986

1987

1988

1989

Artists with the most number-one songs

Excluded statistics
 Artists who appeared in the charity songs of the 1980s, including Band Aid's "Do They Know It’s Christmas?" and USA for Africa's "We Are the World", which were both number-one singles, are not included in the individual tallies.

Most weeks at number one

Key
 – Song of New Zealand origin

See also
Music of New Zealand
List of UK Singles Chart number ones of the 1980s
List of Billboard number-one singles
List of number-one singles in Australia during the 1980s

Notes

References

1980s
New Zealand Singles
1980s in New Zealand music